Watersiporidae is a family of bryozoans in the order Cheilostomatida.

Genera and species
The World Register of Marine Species includes the following genera and species in the family :
Uscia Banta, 1969
Uscia mexicana Banta, 1969
Veleroa Osburn, 1952
Veleroa veleronis Osburn, 1952
Watersipora Neviani, 1896
Watersipora arcuata Banta, 1969
Watersipora aterrima (Ortmann, 1890)
Watersipora atrofusca (Busk, 1856)
Watersipora bidentata (Ortmann, 1890)
Watersipora complanata (Norman, 1864)
Watersipora cucullata (Busk, 1854)
Watersipora mawatarii Vieira, Spencer Jones & Taylor, 2014
Watersipora nigra (Canu & Bassler, 1930)
Watersipora platypora Seo, 1999
Watersipora souleorum Vieira, Spencer Jones & Taylor, 2014
Watersipora subatra (Ortmann, 1890)
Watersipora subtorquata (d'Orbigny, 1852)
Watersipora typica (Okada & Mawatari, 1937)

References

Bryozoan families
Cheilostomatida